The 1922–23 Luxembourg Cup was the second edition of Luxembourg's knockout football tournament.  It began with the First Round on 3 September 1922 and concluded with the Final on 22 April 1923.

Racing Club Luxembourg were the defending champions.

First round 
The First Round matches were played on 3 September 1922. 

|}

Notes
Note 1:  Match was won by forfeit.

Second round 
The Second Round matches were played on 1 October 1922. 

|}

Third round 
The Third Round matches were played on 3 December 1922. 

|}
Notes
Note 2:  Match was won by forfeit.

Quarter-final
The quarter-final matches were played on 7 January 1923. 

|}

Semi-final
The semi-final matches were played on 15 April 1923. 

|}

Final
The Final was played on 22 April 1923.  

|}

References

Luxembourg Cup seasons
Luxembourg Cup
Cup